Carnesville is a city in Franklin County, Georgia, United States, and the county seat. The population was 741 at the 2020 census.

History
Carnesville was founded in 1805 as the seat of Franklin County. It was incorporated as a town in 1819 and as a city in 1901. The town is named after Judge Thomas P. Carnes, a lawyer and congressman of the Revolutionary War era.

In the 1850 census, the area around Carnesville had a free population of 9,131, and a slave population of 2,382.

Geography
Carnesville is located in the center of Franklin County in northeastern Georgia. Interstate 85 passes northwest of the city, with access from Exits 164 and 166. I-85 leads southwest  to Atlanta and northeast  to Greenville, South Carolina.

Carnesville is situated in the watershed of the Broad River, a tributary of the Savannah River.

Demographics

At the 2000 census, there were 541 people, 197 households and 131 families residing in the city. The racial makeup of the city was 73.01% White, 24.95% African American, 0.55% Asian, and 1.48% from two or more races. Hispanic or Latino of any race were 0.37% of the population.

There were 197 households, of which 26.9% had children under the age of 18 living with them, 45.7% were married couples living together, 18.3% had a female householder with no husband present, and 33.0% were non-families. 31.5% of all households were made up of individuals, and 20.3% had someone living alone who was 65 years of age or older. The average household size was 2.43 and the average family size was 3.05.

22.9% of the population were under the age of 18, 9.1% from 18 to 24, 28.7% from 25 to 44, 19.6% from 45 to 64, and 19.8% who were 65 years of age or older. The median age was 38 years. For every 100 females, there were 101.1 males. For every 100 females age 18 and over, there were 97.6 males.

The median household income was $36,719 and the median family income was $42,188. Males had a median income of $32,500 compared with $20,500 for females. The per capita income for the city was $14,016. About 13.8% of families and 17.3% of the population were below the poverty line, including 21.3% of those under age 18 and 16.3% of those age 65 or over.

Education 
The Franklin County School District holds pre-school to grade twelve, and consists of four elementary schools, a middle school, and a high school. The district has 232 full-time teachers and over 2,732 students.
Carnesville Elementary School
Central Franklin Elementary School
Lavonia Elementary School
Royston Elementary School
Franklin County Middle School
Franklin County High School

Recreation
 Carnesville is home to the Georgia Karting Komplex, a 1/4 mile clay oval go-kart track.
 The Victoria Bryant State Park and Tugaloo State Park are located near Carnesville.

In the media
In April 2013, Mayor Harris Little expressed concern over the number of American turkey vultures in Carnesville, and how the U.S. Migratory Bird Act prevented locals from killing them.

Notable people
 "Spud" Chandler; Spurgeon Ferdinand Chandler, pitcher for New York Yankees, 1937–1947, American League MVP 1943
 Sebastian Greco, actor on The Detour.
 Bill Kennedy, pitcher for the Cleveland Indians (1948), St. Louis Browns (1948–1951), Chicago White Sox (1952), Boston Red Sox (1953) and Cincinnati Redlegs (1956–1957)
 Helen Dortch Longstreet, known as the "Fighting Lady", the second wife of Confederate General James Longstreet, and a champion of causes such as preservation of the environment and civil rights
 William Oscar Payne, professor of history and athletic director at the University of Georgia 
 John M. Sandidge, congressman from Louisiana
 Samuel Joelah Tribble, member of the 62nd U.S. Congress
 Pup Phillips, All-American center for Georgia Tech football, member of 1917 national championship team
 Kyle Myers, YouTuber and host of FPSRussia channel, co-host of Painkiller Already podcast

References

External links

 City of Carnesville
 State tourist site for Carnesville
 Franklin County Schools
 Carroll's Methodist Church historical marker

Cities in Georgia (U.S. state)
Cities in Franklin County, Georgia
County seats in Georgia (U.S. state)